Panah in Iran may refer to:
 Panah, Gilan
 Panah, Razavi Khorasan